Danny Watson is a Republican member of the Arkansas House of Representatives, representing the 3rd district which contains most of Hempstead and Nevada counties. Watson defeated incumbent Democratic Representative Brent Talley in his failed reelection bid in the general election held on November 8, 2016. Watson began serving his first term in the 91st General Assembly on January 9, 2017 where he serves on the House Revenue and Taxation Committee, the House Aging, Children and Youth, Legislative and Military Affairs Committee, and the Energy Joint Committee.

Early life and education
Watson attended Louisiana Tech University and graduated with a B.S. in Wildlife Management. He then graduated from the Arkansas Law Enforcement Training Academy and spent 15 years in law enforcement. Watson also had a career as a safety director for a trucking company and served on the school board for the Hope School District for 15 years.

Personal life
Watson lives in Hope, Arkansas with his wife Judy Watson. He is a member of the Hope Kiwanis Club, Hempstead County Chamber of Commerce, and Nevada County Chamber of Commerce. Watson also serves on the board of directors for Southwest Arkansas Development Housing Inc.  He is a Baptist.

References 

Republican Party members of the Arkansas House of Representatives
Year of birth missing (living people)
Living people
Louisiana Tech University alumni
21st-century American politicians